Jimmy Baird (born 1948) is an American film and television actor. He is known for playing Pee Wee Jenkins in the American western television series Fury.

Life and career 
Baird was born in Seattle, Washington. He began his screen career in 1954, appearing in the television series Public Defender. He made his film debut in the same year in the film There's No Business Like Show Business. After that, Baird appeared in the 1955 film The Seven Little Foys playing Eddie Foy Jr. In 1957 Baird joined the cast of the western television series Fury as Pee Wee Jenkins, the friend of Joey Newton (Bobby Diamond). He guest-starred in television programs including Rawhide, The Lone Ranger, Have Gun, Will Travel, Mr. Novak, Bronco, The Danny Thomas Show, The Real McCoys, U.S. Marshal, The Restless Gun, Lassie, The Twilight Zone, Maverick, and My Friend Flicka.

Baird co-starred and appeared in films such as I'll Give My Life, The Return of Dracula, The Black Orchid, Rebel Without a Cause, Operation Eichmann and A Dog's Best Friend.

References

External links 

Rotten Tomatoes profile

1948 births
Living people
People from Seattle
Male actors from Seattle
American male film actors
American male television actors
American male child actors
20th-century American male actors
Western (genre) television actors